Rédoine Faïd (born 10 May 1972) is a French gangster and serial jailbreaker, considered France's most wanted criminal in 2013.

Biography
Faïd was born in Creil to Algerian immigrant parents.

In the mid-1990s, Faïd and Jean-Claude Bisel had led a criminal gang that was responsible for armed robbery, jewel theft, and extortion in the Paris area. In 1997, seven of eight accused were tried for said charges (the eighth having fled to Algeria). Faïd spent three years on the run in Switzerland and the Palestinian Territories before being arrested in 1998. In his autobiography, he claimed to have disguised himself as an Orthodox Jew and learned Hebrew while in Israel, and that he was taught firearms skills by an Israeli soldier. He was sentenced to 30 years in prison, but was released on parole after serving ten years.

In 2009 he wrote a book, Braqueur - Des cités au grand banditisme, (Robber - From the Projects to Organized Crime) about growing up in a life of crime in Paris' banlieues, and claimed to have given up a life of crime. However, he was the suspected mastermind of an armed robbery that claimed the life of a policewoman in 2010, and subsequently was caught after he broke parole conditions in 2011, which returned him to prison for eight years. Contra Mundum Press published an English translation of his book in 2020.

Prison escapes

2013 
On the morning of 13 April 2013, he broke out of the Sequedin prison, using explosives to blast through five prison doors, holding four prison wardens hostage during the escape and employing the use of a getaway car. He then burned the car in Lille and left in another vehicle. The same day, a Europe-wide warrant was issued. Faïd was arrested again on 29 May 2013, in a B&B hotel in Pontault-Combault, Seine-et-Marne, France. Interpol stated that he had been trying to obtain forged documents to reach Israel.

2018 
At around 11:30 am on 1 July 2018, Faïd was broken out of a prison in Réau with the help of three armed accomplices and a helicopter. The helicopter had been hijacked from a nearby airfield by criminals posing as flight school students. At gunpoint, the flying instructor was forced to participate in the escape. The helicopter was later found not far from Charles de Gaulle Airport, where it was believed he and the three men escaped by car, and the flight instructor released uninjured. French police focused primarily on a domestic manhunt, while also considering a potential lead that Faïd had fled abroad, with police cautioning that "beyond his charisma and aura, beyond the folklore, [Faïd] is a dangerous individual."

Three weeks following his escape, Faïd narrowly avoided recapture after being spotted by police near Paris. On 24 July 2018, police identified Faïd as one of two people inside a car observing a service station. As they moved in, the suspects fled towards Sarcelles and managed to get away. The car was later found abandoned in a car park with plastic explosives inside. 

Prior to being apprehended, Faïd used a face-covering Islamic veil, (burqa) to move around in public spaces. Faïd was apprehended again in Creil on 3 October 2018, along with his brother and two other men. Weapons were seized during the police operation.

Media influence 
Faïd has been influenced by American crime films such as Scarface, Reservoir Dogs and Heat.
He reportedly told Michael Mann, the director of Heat "You were my technical adviser". Faïd has also been compared to French bank robber and serial prison escapee Jacques Mesrine (1936–1979), and has described Mesrine as one of his heroes.

Works
 Rédoine Faïd, Braqueur: Des cités au grand banditisme (Paris: Manufacture de Livres, 2010) 
 Rédoine Faïd, Outlaw: Author Armed & Dangerous (New York: Contra Mundum Press, 2020)

See also
Crime in France
List of helicopter prison escapes
List of prison escapes

References

1972 births
20th-century French criminals
21st-century French criminals
Escapees from French detention
Fugitives
French escapees
French gangsters
French male criminals
Living people
People from Creil